Peter Steward (born 27 January 1942) is a former Australian rules footballer who played for North Melbourne in the VFL during the 1960s.

A key defender originally from Kerang, Steward debuted for North Melbourne in 1962. Steward suffered a bad knee injury which kept him out the entire 1965 season after managing just one game in 1964. He returned in 1966 and two years later was at his peak, finishing equal 7th in the Brownlow Medal. The following season he represented Victoria in the 1969 Adelaide Carnival and earned All Australian selection.

When John Dugdale was injured during the 1970 season, Steward captained the club. It turned out to be his last year with them before he moved to play with West Perth. He was twice a premiership player at West Perth and wore the Western Australian jersey at interstate carnivals 5 times. During a 1968 match at Arden Street against Geelong football club, Peter Steward was struck by a Geelong supporter with a "flogger" (a stick with streamers on the end of it), as he was about to kick the ball from the goal square. After this incident and burning of streamers at an Essendon Football club match against Collingwood football club at Windy Hill, Essendon in the early seventies; streamers were consequential banned. Steward played at Centre Half Back and Full back and was a prodigious kick of the ball and was one of North Melbourne's best defenders and during the 60's.

In 2003 Steward was named on the interchange bench in the North Melbourne's official 'Team of the Century'.

External links

1942 births
Australian rules footballers from Victoria (Australia)
North Melbourne Football Club players
West Perth Football Club players
All-Australians (1953–1988)
Living people